Menenotus is a genus of leaf-footed bug in the Coreinae subfamily.

Species
Species within this genus include:
 Menenotus diminutus Walker, 1871 
 Menenotus lunatus (Laporte, 1832)

References 

Coreidae genera
Spartocerini